Thamaraipakkam is a village in Arcot Taluk of Ranipet district in the state of Tamil Nadu, India.

References

Villages in Tiruvallur district